Mount Irvine Bay Golf Club is a golf course in Trinidad and Tobago, known as one of the home courses for professional golfer Stephen Ames.  The course hosted a 1970 episode of Shell's Wonderful World of Golf between Bob Murphy, Dan Sikes and Miller Barber.

Consistently rated among the top 50 courses in the Caribbean, it was voted the number 1 course by readers of Lifestyle & Travel magazine in 1994.

References

Golf clubs and courses in Trinidad and Tobago
Cross country running venues